is a concert hall in Kanazawa, Ishikawa Prefecture, Japan. It opened in 2001 and has two principal performances spaces: the shoebox-style Concert Hall, which seats 1,560; and the Hōgaku Hall, with a capacity of 720, for traditional Japanese music, kabuki, and bunraku. The walls of the main auditorium are finished with urushi. Yoshinobu Ashihara was the architect with acoustic design by Nagata Acoustics, who trialled their concept with a 1:10 scale model. The organ, with sixty-nine stops, is by the Karl Schuke company. Orchestra Ensemble Kanazawa is the resident orchestra.

See also
 Kanazawa Station
 Orchestra Ensemble Kanazawa

References

External links
 Homepage

Buildings and structures in Kanazawa, Ishikawa
Concert halls in Japan
Music venues completed in 2001
2001 establishments in Japan